Expression may refer to:

Linguistics
 Expression (linguistics), a word, phrase, or sentence
 Fixed expression, a form of words with a specific meaning
 Idiom, a type of fixed expression
 Metaphorical expression, a particular word, phrase, or form of words that has a different meaning than its literal form
 Expression (sign language), the expressions and postures of the face and body that contribute to the formation of words when signing

Symbolic expression
 Expression (architecture), implies a clear and authentic displaying of the character or personality of an individual person
 Expression (mathematics), a finite combination of symbols that are well-formed according to applicable rules
 Expression (computer science), an instruction to execute something that will return a value
 Regular expression, a means of matching strings of text in computing
 Expression marks, in music, notating the musical dynamics
 Symbolic computation expression
 S-expression

Bodily expression
 Expression of breast milk in breastfeeding
 Emotional expression, verbal and non-verbal behaviour that communicates emotion  
 Facial expression, a movement of the face that conveys emotional state
 Gene expression, the process by which information from a gene is used in biochemistry

Product names
 Expression (album), a 1967 album by John Coltrane
 Expressions (Chick Corea album), a 1994 album by Chick Corea
 Expressions (Sarah Geronimo album), 2013
 Expressions, an album by Jon Secada
 "Expression" (song), a song by Salt-n-Pepa
 Expressions, the annual magazine of Vidyalankar Institute of Technology, Mumbai, India
 Microsoft Expression Studio, a digital media and graphic design suite
 Ex'pression College for Digital Arts, a college in Emeryville, California for the entertainment industry
 The Expression (album)

Other
 Musical expression
 Method of obtaining (vegetable) οil by pressure extraction, such as Expeller pressing
 Self-expression values

See also
 Express (disambiguation)
 Expressivity (disambiguation)